The Missionary Society of St. Paul may refer to:

 Missionary Society of St Paul (Malta)
 Missionary Society of Saint Paul of Nigeria
 Paulist Fathers